Susan Jane le Jeune d'Allegeershecque  (born 29 April 1963) is a British diplomat who, most recently, served as British High Commissioner to Canada from 2017 to 2021. She previously served as British Ambassador to Austria from 2012 to 2016.

Life and career
Educated at Ipswich High School for Girls, she took a BA degree from the University of Bristol and immediately joined the Foreign and Commonwealth Office in 1985. She served in London and at the permanent representation to the European Union, the High Commission in Singapore, and the Embassies in Venezuela, Colombia, and the United States.

In 2007, she took over as Director of Human Resources at the Foreign Office, replacing Sir David Warren. She served there for four years until 2011, when she was replaced by Menna Rawlings.

In the New Year Honours for 2010, le Jeune d'Allegeershecque was appointed a Companion of the Order of St Michael and St George (CMG).

She then served as British Ambassador to Austria from 2012 until 2016, a post which included serving as the UK's permanent representative to the international organisations based in Vienna, such as the United Nations.

In February 2017, it was announced that le Jeune d'Allegeershecque would succeed Howard Drake from August 2017 as British High Commissioner to Canada. She left this position in August 2021, and was succeeded by Susannah Goshko.

References

External links 
 

Living people
1963 births
Alumni of the University of Bristol
British women ambassadors
Ambassadors of the United Kingdom to Austria
High Commissioners of the United Kingdom to Canada
Companions of the Order of St Michael and St George
British people of French descent